or simply Nesmith (stylized as NESMITH), is a Japanese singer, dancer and actor who is the vocalist and performer of Exile and Exile The Second. He was also member of J Soul Brothers' second generation Nidaime J Soul Brothers until their migration to Exile in 2009.

Biography 
Karim Ryuta Nesmith was born on August 1, 1983, in Kumamoto, Japan. His mother is Japanese and his father Afro-American. Nesmith had always wanted to stand out since he was a child, so he started dreaming about becoming a singer. He was greatly influenced by Western music and artists such as Michael Jackson, Earth Wind and Fire, ZARD and many more. Nesmith's mother supported his dream of becoming a singer strongly and after he received an award in a local karaoke competition and was praised by his friends for his singing skills during junior high school days, he decided to go busking on the streets of his hometown.

Nesmith originally debuted as a member of the duo STEEL in 2001, however they disbanded in the following year. After that, he decided to study abroad in the United States and get in touch with his roots and the music that inspired him. While living 3 months each in Los Angeles and New York, he faced many difficulties since he couldn't speak English at all. However, his vocabulary and English skills improved significantly during his visit. While studying in New York, he stayed at his father's home who lived in New Jersey. The main focus of his studies was on music, especially R&B because he couldn't categorize this music genre properly. During that time, Nesmith was also able to meet Takeda Mayumi whose autobiographical book Fight! (ファイト!) greatly influenced and inspired him when he was bullied in junior high school. They stayed in contact afterwards and are still communicating with each other to this day.

Four years after the disbandment of STEEL, in July 2006, he participated in the EXILE VOCAL BATTLE AUDITION 2006 ~ASIAN DREAM~ and became one of the finalists, which allowed him to join the group Nidaime J Soul Brothers. The five finalists of the audition also formed the unit Dreamers ~EXILE VOCAL BATTLE AUDITION FINALIST~ in 2007. Prior to that, he debuted as a soloist in April 2006. Nidaime J Soul Brothers announced their indefinite hiatus after releasing one album in 2009 and all members joined the line-up of Exile shortly after.

In 2012, Nesmith joined the Exile sub-unit Exile The Second alongside his fellow former Nidaime J Soul Brothers members Shokichi, Kenchi, Keiji and Tetsuya.

In 2013, he also joined the coed-group Dance Earth Party for one year to participate in the Dance Earth project of his fellow Exile member Üsa. Prior to him joining the coed-group, he already participated in the Dance Earth project in 2010 by making his stage debut in its play Dance Earth: Negai.

On March 18, 2019, it was announced that Nesmith would make his musical debut in the Japanese version of the Broadway musical Peter Pan. He would act as the 22nd incarnation of Captain Hook/Darling. Other actors who had played this role before are Shinji Takeda, Rolly and Shinta Furuta for instance. On April 16 in the same year, it was announced that he would also launch a new music program titled NES-FES.(ネスフェス) in his hometown Kumamoto on the 26th of that month. Nesmith would take on the role of the MC and the monthly broadcasting would start on the 50th anniversary of TV Kumamoto. The content of the music program would include inviting various artists and special guests, delivering music information, music discussions, occasional collaborations and the introduction to local artists. On April 27, Nesmith, Leola and Spyair drummer Kenta held the acoustic live event THE PUMP UP ON at LDH Kitchen THE TOKYO HANEDA. It was a collaboration of two programs, EXILE THE SECOND THE ON ~Sound~ (EXILE THE SECOND THE ON ~音~) with Nesmith and SPYAIRのPUMP UP ONE with Kenta. On May 18, he performed at the opening ceremony of WE＝KYUSHU Day in KUMAMOTO (WE＝KYUSHU デー in KUMAMOTO), a festival to celebrate the 30th anniversary of the Hawks Kyushu - Fukuoka relocation and the opening of KAB!.

Participating groups

Discography

Singles

Lyrics

Participating works

Filmography

TV programmes

Films

Stage

Musical

Radio

Live

Advertisements

Others

Bibliography

Manga

Magazine Photography Serialisations

References

External links 

 at Exile Official Website 

 Former
 

Japanese rhythm and blues singers
Musicians from Kumamoto Prefecture
1983 births
Living people
Japanese people of African-American descent
LDH (company) artists
21st-century Japanese singers
21st-century Japanese male singers